Do Kaliyaan is a 1968 Indian Hindi-language film directed by R. Krishnan and S. Panju. The film stars Mala Sinha, Biswajeet, Mehmood, Om Prakash and Neetu Singh. It is a remake of the 1965 Tamil film Kuzhandaiyum Deivamum which itself was based on the 1961 American film The Parent Trap, based on Erich Kästner's 1949 German novel Lisa and Lottie.

Plot 
Proud, wealthy, and haughty Kiran meets with down-to-earth middle-class fellow collegian, Shekhar, and after several clashes and misunderstandings, both fall in love and decide to get married. Shekhar meets with Kiran's dominating mom and mousy dad, and is told that he must successfully pass a test that will be put to him through Kiran's mom, to which he agrees and subsequently passes, much to Kiran's delight. The marriage is performed with great pomp and ceremony and Shekhar becomes a ghar jamai. He soon realizes that his presence is next to a lowly servant. He rebels and wants Kiran to leave with him. But Kiran asks him to be patient. Thereafter identical twin girls are born (Ganga and Jamuna). Shekhar still feels that they would be better off living away from Kiran's family, differences arise, and Shekhar moves out with Ganga. Years later, the identical twins Ganga and Jamuna meet at a school outing and both decide to switch places to see how it is like on the other side. Both twins then devise a scheme that will bring their proud grandmother to her heels, and bring their parents together.

Cast 
 Biswajeet as Shekhar
 Mala Sinha as Kiran
 Neetu Singh as Ganga / Jamuna (Dual Role) ... Credited as Wonder child Baby Sonia
 Mehmood as Mahesh
 Om Prakash as Kiran's Father
 Nigar Sultana as Kiran's Mother, Kamla Devi
 Geethanjali as Menaka (Dance Teacher)
 Manorama as Madhumati
 Hiralal as Contract Killer

Production 
Do Kaliyan was produced by AVM Productions. It is a remake of the studio's own Tamil film Kuzhandaiyum Deivamum (1965), itself based on the American film The Parent Trap (1961). Kuzhandaiyum Deivamum's director duo Krishnan–Panju returned to direct the Hindi remake. Kutty Padmini, who portrayed twin sisters in the original, was initially signed on to reprise her role, but later replaced with Neetu Singh due to conflicts Padmini had with AVM.<ref>{{Cite web |last=கணேஷ் |first=ஆ சாந்தி |title=``என் பொண்ணுங்களை சினிமாவுல நடிக்க அனுமதிக்காததுக்குக் காரணம் இதுதான் - குட்டி பத்மினி ஷேரிங்! |url=https://www.vikatan.com/news/celebrity/this-is-the-reason-why-my-daughters-are-not-allowed-to-act-in-movies-actress-kutty-padmini-sharing |access-date=9 November 2022 |website=Ananda Vikatan |language=ta}}</ref>

 Soundtrack 
Lyrics were by Sahir Ludhianvi.

 Release Do Kaliyan'' was a major commercial success and, according to film historian Randor Guy, "further brightened the radiant image of Meiyappan and AVM Studios".

References

External links 
 

1960s Hindi-language films
1968 comedy films
1968 films
Films based on Lottie and Lisa
Films directed by Krishnan–Panju
Films scored by Ravi
Hindi remakes of Tamil films
Indian children's films
Twins in Indian films